San Pedro is an unincorporated community and census-designated place in Santa Fe County, New Mexico, United States. Its population was 184 as of the 2010 census. New Mexico State Road 344 passes through the community.

Geography

Demographics

Education 
It is within Moriarty-Edgewood School District.

References

Census-designated places in New Mexico
Census-designated places in Santa Fe County, New Mexico